Beats, Cuts and Skits is the sixth and final album released by Roc Raida.  It was released on May 21, 2007 for Adiar Cor Records and featured production from Roc Raida. This was his last album recorded before his 2009 death.

Track listing
"Think It Over" 
"Raida's Theme" (Featuring Wayne O) 
"Hip Hop 101" (Featuring Aasim) 
"Back to Back" (Featuring Saigon) 
"The Truth" (Featuring Fat Joe, Aasim)  
The Truth" (Featuring Smif-n-Wessun) 
"Break the Style Down" (Featuring A.G., Partie Artie) 
"How U Want It" (Featuring Jungle Brothers) 
"The What FM Gong Show" 
"Let It Bang"(Featuring M.O.P.) 
"X-Ecutioners Style" (Featuring Black Thought, Linkin Park) 
"No Joke" (Featuring Saigon, Graph)  
"Hey Thug" 
"Live From The P Jays" (Featuring Ghostface Killah, Trife, Black Thought) 
"Back To Back Pt. 2" Featuring Scram Jones) 
"Another X-Ecution" (Featuring Dilated Peoples) 
"Burn Dat Ass" (Featuring Wayne-O)
"Hip Hop Shit"
"I Got You" 
"The Regulater"
"Funky Piano" (Featuring Wayne-O) 
"I'll Kick Your Ass"

2007 albums
Roc Raida albums